SS Moresby was a British Cargo ship that was torpedoed by the German submarine  in the Mediterranean Sea, 120 nautical miles (220 km) Northwest of Alexandria, Egypt on 28 November 1916 while she was travelling from Saigon, Vietnam to Dunkirk, France carrying a cargo of rice.

Construction 
Moresby was built as Jacob Christensen in 1881 at the Raylton Dixon & Co. shipyard in Middlesbrough, United Kingdom and launched on 23 November that same year before being completed in 1882. The ship had a speed of 9 knots.

1910 grounding 
On the morning of 18 February 1910, Moresby ran aground on the Barrier reef near Lizard Island, Queensland, Australia. Several attempts to free her were unsuccessful and by the next morning, the ship's commander Captain Voy ordered all passengers into the lifeboats to be safely brought to Lizard Island. Captain Voy managed to refloat the ship on the morning of 21 February 1910 and proceeded to pick up the stranded passengers on Lizard Island before continuing its journey. The ship had suffered some damage to its forehold on her port side, but was quickly repaired and returned to service.

Sinking 
Moresby was travelling from Saigon, Vietnam, to Dunkirk, France, while carrying a cargo of rice. Due to the threat posed at sea by German U-boats in the ongoing First World War, Moresby had been defensively armed by her owners. The ship quickly settled by the stern and sank in 12 minutes. Due to the rapid foundering of the ship, no lifeboats could be deployed. Of the 45 crew on board, 33 perished, including the chief officer and his wife, the chief engineer and 29 Chinese crewmembers. Among the 12 survivors were the ship's captain, second officer and seven Chinese crewmembers.

Wreck 
However the current condition of the wreck is unknown.

References

Maritime incidents in 1916
1881 ships
Cargo ships of Australia
Cargo ships of the United Kingdom
Ships built in the United Kingdom
Shipwrecks in the Mediterranean Sea
World War I shipwrecks in the Mediterranean Sea
Ships sunk by German submarines in World War I
Steamships of the United Kingdom